Loopy De Loop is a theatrical cartoon short series produced and directed by William Hanna and Joseph Barbera after leaving MGM and opening their new studio, Hanna-Barbera Productions. 48 cartoons were produced between 1959 and 1965, and released to theatres by Columbia Pictures. It was the final theatrical cartoon series to be produced by William Hanna and Joe Barbera, as well as the only one to be produced by their own studio.

Overview
Loopy is a gentleman wolf who mangles the English language in his bid to converse in a Franco-Canadian accent, and always wears a characteristic tuque knit cap. A self-appointed good Samaritan, he dauntlessly fights to clear the bad name of wolves and opens every episode with his trademark introduction "I am Loopy De Loop, the good wolf." Though he is always kind and helpful, his exploits usually get him beaten up or chased out of town by the very people he has helped, all for no other reason than the prejudice of being a wolf. Still, he never loses faith, and considers himself "kind, considerate and charming."

The character's name is an inspired combination of a play on words:
"Loop the loop" is a 360-degree back flip performed by airplane stunt pilots.
Canis lupus is the Latin-based scientific name for the grey wolf species of the dog family, with the species' name of lupus being the basis for loup, the French word for wolf.
"Loopy" is a synonym for "crazy" or "eccentric"

Analysis

Animation historian Christopher P. Lehman places the Loopy De Loop character and series in the context of their time. Loopy is a wolf devoted to improving the largely negative image of his species. He does not want to be another Big Bad Wolf and chooses to be good. He performs (or attempts to perform) good deeds for other people in a recurring show of generosity. Yet the people he tried to help would be ungrateful, turning on him, and attacking him. Loopy is a character suffering persecution because of his looks and the bad reputation of his entire species, not because of his deeds or his personality. Lehman connects Loopy's fate to the then-contemporary struggles of African Americans to integrate into the wider society of the United States, while facing racial stereotypes which were socially ingrained. Black people were variously stereotyped at the time as humble servants, oversexed brutes, and childlike simpletons. Like Loopy, African Americans had to struggle and overcome the negative reputation of their entire kind.

Lehman notes that the Loopy De Loop animated film series lasted from 1959 to 1965, the most progressive period for the Civil Rights Movement. The series ended following the desegregation efforts of the era, the March on Washington for Jobs and Freedom (1963), the Civil Rights Act of 1964, and the Voting Rights Act of 1965. The movement was noted for its use of nonviolence as a tactic, love as a theme in speech, and integration as a means to achieve the goal of forming a beloved community.

Lehman notes some similarities between Loopy and another French-speaking animated character: Pepé Le Pew (who also had Michael Maltese story contributing). The French language was used by American animation studios to illustrate their characters' loving feelings and these two characters are prime examples of the trope. However, there is a key difference between Loopy and Pepé. Pepé is an amorous character and the aspect of love he embraces is eros. Loopy the Good Samaritan instead embraces agape.

List of theatrical shorts

1959

1960

1961

1962

1963

1964

1965

Television
In 1969, Loopy's film shorts were gathered together into a syndicated television series, simply titled Loopy de Loop.

Cast
Daws Butler as Loopy De Loop
 Other voices include Don Messick, Doug Young, Mel Blanc, Red Coffey, Hal Smith, Arnold Stang, June Foray, Jean Vander Pyl, Julie Bennett, Janet Waldo, Nancy Wible, Howard Morris, and Paul Frees.

Other appearances
 A brief scene from "Two Faced Wolf" appears in The Monkees' film Head.
 Loopy appeared in the 1991 NBC series Yo Yogi!, voiced by Greg Burson. He appears as an employee and owner of The Picnic Basket at Jellystone Mall's food court.
 Loopy appeared in the Harvey Birdman, Attorney at Law episode "Juror in Court". He escapes from the prison along with many Harvey's clients, when his cases are sent to the review. It is unknown why he was there because he never appeared in the show before and was not a client of Harvey. Loopy also appears in a recap of the previous episode in "The Death of Harvey".
 A genderbend version of Loopy appears in the HBO Max show Jellystone! voiced by Ulka Simone Mohanty in a French accent. In contrast to the classic version's optimistic outlook, Loopy here is equipped with a more cynical and deadpan personality. She works with Jabberjaw in Magilla Gorilla's haberdashery.

References in popular culture
 Loopy is quoted (in English) by Sami Frey's character, Franz, in Jean-Luc Godard's French-language feature film, Bande à part.

Home media
On September 9, 2014, Warner Home Video (via Warner Archive) released Loopy De Loop: The Complete Collection on DVD in Region 1 as part of their Hanna–Barbera Classics Collection.

In other languages
 Italian: Lupo de Lupis
 Brazilian Portuguese: Loopy Le Beau
 Portuguese: similar to English
 Spanish: Loopy de Loop, el lobo bueno
 Serbian: Лупи Добрић, добри вук (Lupi Dobrić, dobri vuk)

References

External links
 
Loopy De Loop at Don Markstein's Toonopedia. Archived from the original on November 16, 2015.
 The Cartoon Scrapbook – Loopy De Loop
 The Big Cartoon Database – Loopy De Loop

Film characters introduced in 1959
Animated characters introduced in 1959
Film series introduced in 1959
Animated film series
Columbia Pictures animated short films
Columbia Pictures short films
Television series by Hanna-Barbera
Hanna-Barbera animated films
Hanna-Barbera characters
Television series about wolves
Fictional anthropomorphic characters
Big Bad Wolf
Male characters in animation
American children's animated comedy television series